Tung Wah Hospital is a Charitable hospital in Hong Kong under the Tung Wah Group of Hospitals. Located above Possession Point, at 12 Po Yan Street in Sheung Wan, it is the first hospital established in Colonial Hong Kong for the general public in the 1870s.

History

The hospital was declared for construction on 26 March 1870 under the "Tung Wah Hospital Incorporation Ordinance". The push for the construction of the facility began when the British Colony's Registrar General saw an indiscriminate mix of the dead and dying huddled together in the nearby Kwong Fook I-tsz, a small temple built at Tai Ping Shan Street. The large number of deaths were in part due to the arrival of the upcoming Third Pandemic of bubonic plague from China, though it was not declared an official establishment until 1872. The hospital was subsidized by the government at a price of HKD 45,000 along with HKD 15,000 in land grant. The grand opening on 14 February 1872 was considered the grandest ever witnessed in Colonial Hong Kong. A lot of cultural prejudice did exist at the time, such as Chinese citizens not trusting western medicine and other practices such as surgery. Many Chinese would rather die than be admitted into a western clinic. The government subsequently enacted Ordinance No. 38 known as "1911 Expansion of Tung Wah Hospital Ordinance" in 1911 to deal with the population growth of Kowloon and the New Territories in conjunction with Kwong Wah Hospital.

Background
With 633 beds, including 494 for in-patients, 93 for day patients and 46 rehabilitation day places, it is the second largest general hospital in Hong Kong West Cluster. The Main Block of Tung Wah Hospital is graded as Grade I historic building. It is affiliated with the Li Ka Shing Faculty of Medicine, while the University of Hong Kong provide clinical attachment opportunities for its medical students.

See also
 Seaman's Hospital

References

External links

Tung Wah Hospital

Hospital buildings completed in 1872
Hospitals in Hong Kong
Possession Point
Grade I historic buildings in Hong Kong
Hospitals established in 1870